Charlie Baker (born 24 March 1939) is an Australian cricketer. He played two first-class matches for New South Wales in 1968/69.

See also
 List of New South Wales representative cricketers

References

External links
 

1939 births
Living people
Australian cricketers
New South Wales cricketers
Cricketers from Newcastle, New South Wales